Anthidium chubuti is a species of bee in the family Megachilidae, the leaf-cutter, carder, or mason bees.

Distribution
Argentina
Chile

Synonyms
Synonyms for this species include:
Anthidium patagonicum Schrottky, 1910
Anthidium gutierrezi Moure, 1957

References

chubuti
Insects described in 1910